Freedom from the Known is a book by Jiddu Krishnamurti (1895–1986), originally published 1969.

About the work
The book contains excerpts from previously unpublished Krishnamurti talks selected and edited by Mary Lutyens. Lutyens was one of his authorized biographers and a lifelong friend.

Select editions

See also
Jiddu Krishnamurti bibliography

References

External links
Freedom from the Known  – J. Krishnamurti Online [JKO]. Web document serial no./id: JKO 237. Krishnamurti Foundations. "J. Krishnamurti Online, the official repository of the authentic teachings of Jiddu Krishnamurti." Retrieved 2011-03-04.
Freedom from the Known – Book download page from Theosophy World Resource Centre.

1969 non-fiction books
Books by Jiddu Krishnamurti
Philosophy books
Harper & Row books